Events in the year 1753 in Norway.

Incumbents
Monarch: Frederick V

Events

Arts and literature

Births
2 September - Johan Michael Lund, lawyer and Prime Minister of the Faroe Islands (died 1824)
30 October - Henrik Carstensen, businessman, timber merchant and shipowner (died 1835)

Deaths
4 November – Iver Elieson, merchant (born 1683).

See also

References